Live at Montmartre (also released as Stan's Party) is a live album by saxophonist Stan Getz which was recorded at the Jazzhus Montmartre in 1977 and released on the SteepleChase label.

Reception

The AllMusic review by Ken Dryden said that "All of the musicians are in top form throughout... This is an excellent outing that belongs in every Stan Getz fan's collection."

Track listing

Disc One
 "Morning Star" (Rodgers Grant) – 12:51
 "Lady Sings the Blues" (Alec Wilder) – 7:59
 "Cançao do Sol" (Milton Nascimento) – 8:46
 "Lush Life" (Billy Strayhorn) – 4:43
 "Stan's Blues" (Stan Getz) – 8:06
 "La Fiesta" (Chick Corea) – 8:58 Bonus track on CD reissue

Disc Two
 "Infant Eyes" (Wayne Shorter) – 6:37
 "Lester Left Town" (Shorter) – 13:25
 "Eiderdown" (Steve Swallow) – 12:26
 "Blues for Dorte" (Getz) – 8:22
 "Con Alma" (Dizzy Gillespie) – 18:16 Bonus track on CD reissue

Personnel 
Stan Getz – tenor saxophone 
Joanne Brackeen – piano, electric piano 
Niels-Henning Ørsted Pedersen – bass
Billy Hart – drums

References 

1977 live albums
Stan Getz live albums
SteepleChase Records live albums
Albums recorded at Jazzhus Montmartre